The Great Seal of the State of Nevada is derived from the Seal of the Territory of Nevada. As Nevada prepared for statehood in 1864, its Constitutional Convention began to formalize the features of the state's official seal. Nevada was admitted as a state on October 31, 1864 by proclamation of President Abraham Lincoln. On February 24, 1866, the motto "Volens et Potens" ("Willing and Able") was replaced by "All for Our Country". The design of the seal was formalized, and Nevada's mineral resources are featured with a silver miner and his team moving a cartload of ore from a mountain in the foreground. A quartz mill stands before another mountain. Transportation and communication are symbolized by a train steaming across the background, with telegraph poles spanning the distance. Agriculture is represented by a sheaf of wheat, a sickle, and a plow in the foreground. Nevada's natural environment is symbolized by a brilliant sun rising over snow-capped peaks. The inner circle of the seal carries the motto "All for Our Country", and Nevada's entry into the Union as the 36th state is shown with 36 stars completing the inner ring. The perimeter of the seal proclaims "The Great Seal of the State of Nevada".  Mark Twain was said to have convinced the designer to make the two trails of smoke blow in opposite directions as a prank, which was later rectified when the mistake was realized.

See also

Symbols of the state of Nevada
Flag of Nevada

References

External links
 NRS 235.010 – The Great Seal of the State of Nevada

Symbols of Nevada
Nevada
Nevada
Nevada
Nevada
Nevada
Nevada
Nevada
Nevada
Nevada